Chizha test range is a missile test range on the Kanin Peninsula in the Nenets Autonomous Okrug in northern Russia. 

The village of Chizha is located on the River Chizha, which flows into the Barents Sea on the west side of the Kanin Peninsula.

On 19 October 2012 an R-29R Submarine-launched ballistic missile was launched from the Delta III class submarine K-433 Svyatoy Georgiy Pobedonosets towards the test range at Chizha.

The same submarine had previously launched a missile towards Chizha on 28 October 2010, and on 9 October 2009.

See also
Kura Test Range

References

Nenets Autonomous Okrug
Buildings and structures in Nenets Autonomous Okrug